Lower Canada College (LCC) is an English-language elementary and secondary level independent school located in Montreal, Quebec. It is located in the Monkland Village area of the Notre-Dame-de-Grâce neighbourhood. The school offers education from Kindergarten through Grade 12. Students graduate from Grade 11 and then have the option of leaving the school and going to a Pre-University college (unique to the Quebec system) or returning to LCC for the Pre-University year.

Once boys-only, LCC is now co-educational, with roughly 40 percent of the student body being female. Girls were first admitted to Grade 12 in 1992 and were phased into the other grades beginning in the 1995–96 school year.

Until recently, LCC was one of the few remaining schools with a covered outdoor ice hockey rink. This has been replaced by a new athletics centre, as well as a new arena. In addition to hockey, LCC has been known for fielding strong teams in Canadian football, 
soccer and basketball. Rugby was canceled in 2017 because it was deemed "too dangerous". LCC's traditional rival in sports and other matters is Selwyn House School.

The annual tuition fees for attending LCC range from $18,695 to $23,845. International students in high school also have to pay an additional $4,771 to cover the grant the school receives for local students. The school receives subsidies from the provincial government that is available to all private schools for Grades 7 to 11, which means all students in the high school section must have a certificate of eligibility allowing them to attend government-funded English schools in Quebec in accordance with Bill 101. Students without the certificate can attend the non-subsidized elementary school section and qualify for the certificate after three years as long as they and any siblings have never previously attended a French school.

History
Lower Canada College was opened on Royal Avenue by Dr. Charles Fosbery on September 20, 1909. LCC can trace its roots to 1861, when the boarding school St. John's School was started by the Church of St John the Evangelist.

In 1995, LCC added enrolment for female students. Before then admission was available to the Pre-University (PreU) program exclusively. Today, women account for approximately 50% of the student population.

Houses
LCC, like many other Commonwealth schools, divides its students into houses. These eight houses are named after alumni. There is also one house specifically for Grade 12 students.  They are:

Beveridge (Orange)
Claxton (Red)
Drummond (White)
French (Blue)
Harper (Green)
Heward (Black)
Russel (Grey)
Woods (Maroon) 
Webster (Purple, Grade 12 house)

It is an annual tradition for the eight houses to engage in "Shourawe", a spirited day dedicated to house competitions such as Tug of war. Prior to 2008, this day was known as "House Wars". However, the barbaric etymology of the term evoked backlash and pressure from parents, causing LCC to reconfigure the letters into a less belligerent anagram. Conversely, the Tug of war event has yet to be renamed as a politically correct euphemism. Throughout the school year students compete in friendly inter-school competitions to raise house points. competitions like the food drive, toy drive, bake sales, pep rallies and more.

International Baccalaureate
In 2013, LCC began implementing the International Baccalaureate programme for some students in its grade 11 class. They plan on extending the program to grade 12 in 2014. Currently, there are approximately 25 students in the IB programme.

Admissions
 LCC receives subsidies from the provincial government and therefore abides by the French Language Charter, restricting enrolment of students to eligible parties specified in the charter.

Athletics
LCC instills a strong sense of sportsmanship into its students. Their hockey team is a force to be reckoned with and often goes abroad to tournaments in Ottawa,Toronto and even to the United States. LCC also has a football and soccer team who trains on campus on LCC's very own Saputo Field and Dave Woods Field. In addition, the Velan gyms are home to a very strong basketball team, volleyball team, badminton and, rarely, ping pong tournaments. Not only does LCC boast a newly renovated gym (Tsatas fitness centre) but its newest addition to the athletics facilities is the Outdoor Miller Rink.

Notable alumni and former faculty
Alumni include:

John Aimers
W. David Angus
Alex Anthopoulos
René Balcer
Peter Behrens
Gerald Birks
Willard Boyle
John Brownstein
Brooke Claxton
James Campbell Clouston
Wade Davis
Arnold Davidson Dunton
Nirra Fields
Richard Goldbloom
Victor Goldbloom
George Ignatieff
Lou Marinoff
Pierre McGuire
Stuart McLean
Gordon Nixon (born 1957)
Larry Rossy
Greg Rusedski (born 1973)
Bernard Shapiro
Harold Tafler Shapiro
Lance Stroll (born 1998)
Todd van der Heyden

Faculty include:
Hugh MacLennan
F. R. Scott

See also
 Upper Canada College

References

External links

English-language schools in Quebec
Elementary schools in Montreal
High schools in Montreal
Private schools in Quebec
Preparatory schools in Quebec
Educational institutions established in 1861
Côte-des-Neiges–Notre-Dame-de-Grâce
1861 establishments in Canada